Roger William Reeves (born January 1980) is an American poet.

Life

Early life and education 
Reeves was born and raised in southern New Jersey. He earned a B.A. in English from Morehouse College, an M.A. in English from Texas A & M University, an MFA from the James A. Michener Center for Creative Writing at the University of Texas at Austin, and a Ph.D. from the University of Texas at Austin.

Career 
Reeves' work has appeared in Poetry, Ploughshares, American Poetry Review,Boston Review, Gulf Coast, Tin House,and The Paris American.
His debut collection of poetry, King Me, was published in 2013 by Copper Canyon Press and was honored as a Library Journal “Best Poetry Book of 2013.” His second collection of poetry, Best Barbarian, was published in 2022 by W.W. Norton.

Reeves has been awarded a 2015 Whiting Award, a 2013 NEA Fellowship, a 2013 Pushcart Prize, a 2008 Ruth Lilly Fellowship from the Poetry Foundation, two Bread Loaf Scholarships, an Alberta H. Walker Scholarship from the Provincetown Fine Arts Work Center and two Cave Canem Fellowships.  For the 2014–2015 school year, Reeves was a Hodder Fellow of Princeton University.
 
Reeves was an assistant professor of poetry at the University of Illinois, Chicago, and is now an associate professor of English at the University of Texas at Austin.  In 2021, he was awarded the Suzanne Young Murray Fellowship at Harvard Radcliffe Institute.

Poetry

References

External links

Profile at The Whiting Foundation

1980 births
Living people
American male poets
21st-century American poets
Michener Center for Writers alumni
Morehouse College alumni
Texas A&M University alumni
21st-century American male writers